Caithness, Sutherland and Easter Ross is a constituency of the House of Commons of the Parliament of the United Kingdom (Westminster). It is the most northerly constituency on the British mainland. It elects one Member of Parliament (MP) by the first-past-the-post system of election.

The constituency is estimated to have voted to leave the EU by a margin of 52% to 48% in the 2016 Brexit referendum.

Since the 2017 general election, the constituency has been represented by Jamie Stone of the Liberal Democrats.

Boundaries

1997–2005: Caithness District, Sutherland District, and the Ross and Cromarty District electoral divisions of Easter Ross, Invergordon, and Tain.

2005–present: The Highland Council wards of Alness and Ardross, Brora, Caithness Central, Caithness North East, Caithness North West, Caithness South East, Dornoch Firth, Ferindonald, Golspie and Rogart, Invergordon, Pulteneytown, Rosskeen and Saltburn, Seaboard, Sutherland Central, Sutherland North West, Tain East, Tain West, Thurso Central, Thurso East, Thurso West, Tongue and Farr, Wick, and Wick West.

The constituency was created in 1997 by merging Caithness and Sutherland with an area from Ross, Cromarty and Skye which was abolished.

In 2005 the Westminster constituency was enlarged slightly, to include a small area from Ross, Skye and Inverness West. The rest of the latter was divided between two new constituencies, Ross, Skye and Lochaber and Inverness, Nairn, Badenoch and Strathspey.

It is also the second-largest UK constituency by area, behind Ross, Skye and Lochaber.

Local government area
See also Politics of the Highland council area
Since it was created in 1997 the constituency has been one of three covering the Highland council area. Since 2005 the other two have been Ross, Skye and Lochaber and Inverness, Nairn, Badenoch and Strathspey. From 1997 to 2005 the other constituencies of the council area were Ross, Skye and Inverness West and Inverness East, Nairn and Lochaber. Caithness, Sutherland and Easter Ross is the most northerly of the constituencies, and it now has the Ross, Skye and Lochaber constituency on its southern boundary.

As enlarged in 2005, the Caithness, Sutherland and Easter Ross constituency covered 23 out of the 80 wards of the council area: all ten wards of the Caithness area committee, all six wards of the Sutherland area committee and seven (Alness and Ardross, Invergordon, Ferindonald, Rosskeen and Saltburn, Seaboard, Tain East and Tain West)  out of the 18 wards of the Ross and Cromarty area committee. 

Ward boundaries were redrawn again in 2007, and the management areas were abolished in favour of three new corporate management areas. The new areas consist of groups of the new wards, and boundaries are similar to those of the Westminster constituencies, as defined in 2005. Two areas, the Caithness, Sutherland and Easter Ross area and the Ross, Skye and Lochaber area, have the names of Westminster constituencies. The name of the third area, the Inverness, Nairn, and Badenoch and Strathspey area, is very similar to that of the third constituency.

Scottish Parliament
In 1999 a Scottish Parliament (Holyrood) constituency was created with the name and boundaries of the Westminster constituency.

At Holyrood the area of the Westminster constituency is represented by an even larger constituency, Caithness, Sutherland and Ross.

Members of Parliament

Election results

Elections in the 2010s

This was the smallest Liberal Democrat majority at the 2019 general election.

Elections in the 2000s

Fourth Periodic Review boundaries

Elections in the 1990s

References 

Westminster Parliamentary constituencies in Scotland
Constituencies of the Parliament of the United Kingdom established in 1997
Highland constituencies, UK Parliament (historic)
Highland constituencies, UK Parliament